is a 2007 film directed by Gavin Youngs. It stars Mariko Takahashi, Paul Ashton, Erica Baron, Megan Drury, Taiyo Sugiura, Daniel Maloney, and Nick Hose.

Cast
Mariko Takahashi as Chiho
Paul Ashton as Matthew
Erica Baron as Michelle
Megan Drury as Karen
Taiyo Sugiura as Takashi
Daniel Maloney as Wade
Nick Hose as Byron
Robert Ian Evans as Luc
Jeff Bowen as Petersen

See also
List of lesbian, gay, bisexual or transgender-related films

References

External links
Japanese Official Site

2007 films
2000s English-language films
2000s Japanese-language films
Australian LGBT-related films
Japanese LGBT-related films
Lesbian-related films
2007 LGBT-related films
2000s Japanese films